The Volkswagen Race Touareg 3 was an off-road competition car specially designed to take part in the rally raids with the main objective of winning the Dakar Rally.

Dakar victories

See also
Volkswagen Touareg

References

External links
 Volkswagen Race Touareg 3: official details, photos and specs

Rally cars
Rally raid cars
Dakar Rally winning cars